Flower Fables was the first work published by Louisa May Alcott and appeared on December 9, 1854. The book was a compilation of fanciful stories first written six years earlier for Ellen Emerson (daughter of Ralph Waldo Emerson). The book was published in an edition of 1600 and though Alcott thought it "sold very well", she received only about $35 from the Boston publisher, George Briggs.

References

External links

Bibliography
 Matteson, John. "Eden's Outcasts: The Story of Louisa May Alcott and her Father". W. W. Norton & Company, Inc, New York, New York, 2007. .

Works by Louisa May Alcott
Ralph Waldo Emerson
American short story collections
Children's short story collections
1854 short story collections
1850s children's books